"Beardy" or beardie may refer to:

 Bearded dragon, a type of lizard
 Bearded collie, a type of dog
 Leung Kar Yan, an actor and director
 Richard Branson, founder of Virgin group of companies, commonly called Beardy by Jeremy Clarkson